Denise Prins (born 22 February 1983) is a former Dutch international cricketer whose career for the Dutch national side spanned from 2004 to 2010.

Born in Schiedam, Prins played her club cricket for Hermes-DVS, which is based in the city. Her senior debut for the Netherlands came in May 2004, when she played against two English county teams (Warwickshire and Durham), but she did not play in an international until August 2006, when she featured in a One Day International (ODI) game against Ireland. Prins's first major international tournament for the Netherlands was the 2008 World Cup Qualifier in South Africa, where she played in three matches with little success. In total, she played in seven ODIs, with her final matches in the format coming at the 2010 ICC Women's Challenge. At that tournament, Prins also played the only Twenty20 International matches of her career, with the first coming against the South Africa and the second (and final) coming against the West Indies.

References

1983 births
Dutch women cricketers
Living people
Netherlands women One Day International cricketers
Netherlands women Twenty20 International cricketers
Sportspeople from Schiedam
Sportspeople from South Holland
20th-century Dutch women
20th-century Dutch people
21st-century Dutch women